Echoes of an Era is an album by American R&B/jazz singer Chaka Khan, Joe Henderson, Freddie Hubbard, Chick Corea, Stanley Clarke and Lenny White, released in 1982 on Elektra Records.

On Echoes of an Era, the group interprets jazz standards and songs from the Great American Songbook. The album was originally credited to Echoes of an Era, with all six performers listed on the album cover and Khan getting top billing.

The album was digitally remastered and re-released by the Warner Music Group's sublabel Rhino Entertainment in 2003. The final track of the reissue, "Spring Can Really Hang You Up the Most", included bonus audio of an interview with Chaka Khan and Freddie Hubbard in an interview lasting a little over 7 minutes.

In 2011, Corea, Clarke and White's group Return to Forever recorded "High Wire – The Aerialist" and "I Loves You Porgy" with Khan on vocals.

Track listing

Personnel
 Chaka Khan - vocals
 Joe Henderson - tenor saxophone
 Freddie Hubbard - trumpet, flugelhorn
 Chick Corea - piano
 Stanley Clarke - acoustic bass
 Lenny White - drums

Production
 Lenny White - record producer
 Bernie Kirsch - sound engineer
 Recorded at Mad Hatter Studios, Los Angeles, California.

Chart performance

References

External links
Echoes of an Era at Discogs

1982 albums
Chaka Khan albums
Albums produced by Lenny White
Elektra/Musician albums
Jazz albums by American artists
Covers albums